Year 722 (DCCXXII) was a common year starting on Thursday (link will display the full calendar) of the Julian calendar. The denomination 722 for this year has been used since the early medieval period, when the Anno Domini calendar era became the prevalent method in Europe for naming years.

Events 
 By place 

 Europe 
 Summer – Battle of Covadonga: Visigothic nobleman Pelagius (Don Pelayo) defeats the Umayyad forces under Munuza, provincial governor of Asturias, at Picos de Europa (near Covadonga). This marks the beginning of the Reconquista, the Christian reconquest of the Iberian Peninsula. He founds the Kingdom of Asturias, and establishes a military base at Cangas de Onís (northwest of Spain) (or 718).

 Britain 

 King Ine of Wessex attempts a takeover of Dumnonia, but his armies are crushed, and he is forced to withdraw. Queen Æthelburg, wife of Ine, destroys the royal castle of Taunton, to prevent its seizure by rebels under Ealdbert.
 The Battle of Allen is fought close by the Hill of Allen (Ireland) between the Laigin, led by King Murchad mac Brain Mut, and the forces of Fergal mac Máele Dúin (High King of Ireland).
 Battle of Hehil: The West Saxons are defeated by a combined Viking and Cornish army, at Cornovii in Cornwall (approximate date).

 Mesoamerica 
 January 3 – King K'inich Ahkal Mo' Naab III takes the throne of the Maya city-state of Palenque (southern Mexico).

 By topic 
 Religion 
 November 30 – Wessex-born Boniface is ordained as bishop of Germany by Pope Gregory II. Under the protection of Charles Martel (mayor of the palace), he concentrates his religious work in Hessia and Thuringia. 
 Emperor Leo III enforces the baptism of all Jews and Montanists in the Byzantine Empire.

Births 
 Fruela I, king of Asturias (approximate date)
 Isma'il ibn Jafar, Shī‘ah Imām and scholar (or 719)

Deaths 
 September 29 – Leudwinus, Frankish bishop
 Beli II, king of Strathclyde (approximate date)
 Fergal mac Máele Dúin, High King of Ireland
 Máel Ruba, Irish abbot (b. 642)
 Mujahid ibn Jabr, Muslim scholar

References